The 8th Japan Record Award was held on December 24, 1966.  Yukio Hashi became the first singer that get the 2nd JRA.

Emcee
Ayuurou Miki
2nd time as the emcee for JRA.

Award Winners
Japan Record Award
 Yukio Hashi for "Muhyou" 
2nd award after 4 years.
 Lyricist: Tetsuo Miyagawa
 Composer: Ichirou Tone
 Arranger: Yoshitaka Ichinose
 Record Company: JVC Victor

Vocalist Award
Kazuo Funaki for "Zesshou"

New Artist Award
Ichirou Araki for "Sora Ni Hoshi Ga Aruyouni"
Tokiko Kato for "Akai Fussen"

Composer Award
Kuranosuke Hamaguchi for "Hoshi No Flamenco" and "Bara Ga Saita"
Singer: Teruhiko Saigō and Mike Maki

Arranger Award
Kenichirou Morioka for "Kimi To Itsumademo" and "Aitakute Aitakute"
Singer: Yūzō Kayama and Mari Sono 

Lyricist Award
Tokiko Iwatani for "Aitakute Aitakute" and "Kimi To Itsumademo" 
Singer: Mari Sono and Yūzō Kayama
2nd award after 2 years.

Special Award
Yūzō Kayama 

Planning Award
EMI Music Japan for "Nihon No Uta"
Singer: Duke Aces

Children's Song Award
Susumu Ishikawa for "Obake No Q-Taro"

Nominations

JRA

Vocalist Award

New Artist Award
Male

Female

Composer Award

Arranger Award

Lyricist Award

Special Award

Planning Award

Children's Song Award

References

Japan Record Awards
Japan Record Awards
Japan Record Awards
1966